Extra Large may refer to:
Extra large, clothing size
XL - Extra Large, 2008 Indonesian film
Extra Large (2022 film)'', a short film by Barbara Butch